Justice is a twelve-issue American comic book limited series published bimonthly by DC Comics from August 2005 through June 2007, written by Alex Ross and Jim Krueger, with art also by Ross and Doug Braithwaite. Its story involves the superhero team known as the Justice League of America confronting the supervillain team the Legion of Doom after every supervillain is motivated by a shared dream that seems to be a vision of the planet's destruction, which they intend to avoid.

Development
Coming off their previous project, Earth X from Marvel Comics, Alex Ross, Jim Krueger, and Doug Braithwaite started on Justice, a 12-issue bi-monthly series. Ross described the series as a full-on superhero war, the Super Friends versus the Legion of Doom, to the death. 

Ross had stated that, following Kingdom Come, he wanted to break away from the 1990s fixation with superhuman wars, and focused on The World's Greatest Super-Heroes. It was only following that that he could return to the war stories he is known for, like Kingdom Come.

Plot
Several supervillains start having recurring nightmares where Earth is destroyed by a nuclear Armageddon that the Justice League of America fails to prevent. Believing that the League's overconfidence in their own abilities and the exaggerated faith humanity has in them will be their ruin, the villains decide to band together to destroy the Justice League and save the world as they see fit. Toyman, Scarecrow, Poison Ivy and Captain Cold help solve the world's greatest problems, like hunger and physical disabilities, which turns public opinion against the Justice League.

Meanwhile, Lex Luthor and Black Manta capture Aquaman and take him to an alien city located within a black sphere at the bottom of the sea, where he is left under the care of Brainiac. The Martian Manhunter locates him, as Aquaman has telepathically instructed the oceanic wildlife to form lines visible from space that point to his location. Before he can free Aquaman, the Manhunter is ambushed by Gorilla Grodd, who incapacitates him with a psychic attack.

Batman captures The Riddler, who had stolen secret files about the Justice League's members' weaknesses from the Bat-Computer, and imprisons him in Arkham Asylum, but he is rescued by Luthor. In the process, the Joker finds out that he hasn't been invited to Luthor's secret society of supervillains and becomes furious.

Red Tornado eventually finds clues that might lead to Aquaman's location, but is surprised by a traitor among the Justice League's ranks, who destroys him and gives Grodd access to the Watchtower's computers and its members' secret identities.

Superman is attacked by Metallo, Parasite, Bizarro and Solomon Grundy. He emits a call for help that the Flash tries to answer, only to find out he has been poisoned by Captain Cold and is being forced to run non-stop until he dies from exhaustion.

Wonder Woman is poisoned by Cheetah with the blood of a Centaur, and starts to revert to the clay from which she was born. The Green Lantern is ambushed by Sinestro and teleported to the end of the Universe; without enough energy to return, Hal transforms himself into pure energy and stores himself inside his power ring in order to survive.

Green Arrow and Black Canary are attacked by Scarecrow and Clayface, while Hawkman and Hawkwoman are surprised by Toyman and the Atom is shot by Giganta.

Luthor, the Riddler, Poison Ivy and Black Manta invite everyone who wishes to join them to live in alien cities contained within black spheres, secretly provided by Brainiac, who lobotomizes Aquaman.

Superman's call for help is answered by Captain Marvel, who singlehandedly dispatches Superman's aggressors. Marvel takes Superman to the Batcave, and discovers that both Superman and Batman have been infected with mechanical worms. These worms had mind controlled Batman into destroying Red Tornado. Captain Marvel throws Superman into the Sun, destroying the worms. They head to the Watchtower to get some answers, but it explodes before they can board it.  Captain Marvel and Superman work out a plan to save the Flash. Marvel uses the speed of Mercury to catch up to the Flash and knocks him off balance with his magic lightning bolt. The plan nearly kills both Captain Marvel and the Flash, but Superman is able to save them.

The Martian Manhunter regains control of his body and calls Zatanna to help save Aquaman and Red Tornado. They retrieve Aquaman's body from Brainiac's city and take it to Dr. Niles Caulder, leader of the Doom Patrol, who saves him and returns him to life. They recover Red Tornado's remains from the destroyed Watchtower and have them fixed by Doc Magnus, leader of the Metal Men.

From there, they warn Hawkman and Hawkwoman, who had defeated Toyman, that his hideout is located in Midway City, where they find out that he is building robotic bodies for Brainiac, and have the Phantom Stranger rescue Green Lantern. Green Arrow, Black Canary, the Atom, Plastic Man, Elongated Man, Metamorpho, the Metal Men and the Doom Patrol are all called to Superman's Fortress of Solitude in the Arctic.

Batman is found by Wonder Woman, who is able to return him to sanity with her magic lasso. They capture Captain Cold, who reveals the truth: The dream was fabricated by Luthor, Brainiac and Grodd to create a Legion of Doom and use them to destroy the Justice League. The mechanical worms were stolen designs from Dr. Sivana, based on Mr. Mind's powers, and Brainiac lobotomized Aquaman to find out if his brain could be used to control Grodd. It couldn't, but his baby son's can, and Black Manta kidnaps him. Black Adam also joins Luthor's cabal.

The heroes' sidekicks are mind-controlled by the worms and their loved ones are abducted. They discover that the worms are actually turning humans into robots as part of Brainiac's plan to mechanize the Universe, and attack Luthor's city to stop their plans, using armor that protects them from the worms.

After a big battle, most of the villains are defeated, but Brainiac, Scarecrow, Poison Ivy, Cheetah and Black Manta escape. John Stewart is given Jordan's ring and uses it to erase the heroes' secret identities from everyone's minds and to destroy the worms. He returns the ring to Hal and they capture the remaining villains and stop Brainiac, who takes control of Earth's nuclear arsenals in order to bring about the nuclear Armaggedon from the nightmare.

Meanwhile, the Joker sabotages Luthor's cities and takes down the Scarecrow. Aquaman, Wonder Woman and the Atom quickly take down Black Manta, Cheetah and Poison Ivy, leaving only Brainiac at large.

After a drawn-out battle, Superman, Red Tornado and Zatanna defeat the villain while the Green Lantern Corps prevents the nuclear Armaggedon. Luthor, Brainiac and the others are imprisoned and Wonder Woman is taken to Themyscira, the Paradise-Island, where her mother, Queen Hippolyta, restores her with the help of the Gods.

All returns to normal, but Batman wonders if the Justice League will, one day, really accomplish world peace. Meanwhile, in Metropolis, Superman is observed by the Legion of Super-Heroes from the 31st century, a Utopian future, proving that they will succeed one day.

Continuity
Justice takes place outside of the regular DC Universe continuity, with most of the characters featured in the story being modern day incarnations of their Silver Age of comic books counterparts. The series heavily draws upon the 1970s Super Friends animated series, most notably the Challenge of the Super Friends incarnation, which featured the Legion of Doom as regular characters.

In an interview, Alex Ross jokingly compared the series to the All-Star Batman and Robin, the Boy Wonder and All-Star Superman, two comics which like Justice take place outside the existing DC Universe. All three titles launched within the same time period as part of a wave of continuity-free incarnations of popular DC Universe properties, though Justice did not feature the "All-Star" labeling.

Characters
The story focused on the Justice League centric storyline, though other characters from the DC Universe appear in supporting roles.

Justice League of America
The roster of the Justice League of America in the story are mostly based on the incarnation of the team seen in the 1970s and early 1980s, commonly referred to as the Justice League Satellite era.

Superman
Batman
Wonder Woman
The Flash
Green Lantern
Martian Manhunter
Aquaman
Green Arrow
Hawkman
Hawkwoman
Atom
Black Canary
Captain Marvel
Elongated Man
Metamorpho
Phantom Stranger
Plastic Man
Red Tornado
Zatanna

Other heroes
Doom Patrol (the Silver Age incarnation)
Doc Magnus
John Stewart
Metal Men
Teen Titans (featuring their Silver Age incarnation)
Supergirl
Batgirl
Captain Marvel, Jr.
Mary Marvel
Legion of Super-Heroes

Legion of Doom roster
The supervillain team isn't based on any one from the comics, but instead based on the villain group from the Super Friends television series. While the original lineup is used, additional villains were added for the series.

Bizarro
Black Adam
Black Manta
Brainiac
Captain Cold
Cheetah
Clayface
Giganta
Gorilla Grodd
Lex Luthor
Metallo
Parasite
Poison Ivy
The Riddler
Scarecrow
Sinestro
Solomon Grundy
Toyman

Other villains
The Joker
Two-Face
Doctor Sivana

Collected editions
The series has been collected into three hardcover volumes, followed by an Absolute DC edition:
 Volume 1 (collects #1–4, hardcover, 160 page, DC Comics)
 Volume 2 (collects #5–8, hardcover, 160 page, DC Comics)
 Volume 3 (collects #9–12, hardcover, 160 page, October 2007, DC Comics)
 Absolute Edition, (collects #1–12, 496 page, September 2009, DC Comics)
 Justice (trade paperback, collects #1–12, 384 pgs, June 2012, DC Comics)

Other media
DC Direct released a line of action figures based on the mini-series, which include figures of Superman, Batman, Wonder Woman, Flash, Green Lantern, Martian Manhunter, Aquaman, Red Tornado, Plastic Man, Hawkman, John Stewart, Supergirl, Batgirl, Captain Marvel, Black Canary, Lex Luthor, Brainiac, Cheetah, Black Manta, Bizarro, Poison Ivy, The Joker, Captain Cold, Toyman, Solomon Grundy, Scarecrow, Parasite, Sinestro, Gorilla Grodd, Zatanna and Black Adam.

References

External links

On Justice: Alex Ross Talks Justice I, Newsarama, part one.
On Justice: Alex Ross Talks Justice II, Newsarama, part two.
"Incoming: Alex Ross’ Justice" On the latest series of figures based on the series (Superman and Aquaman in their attack suits, as well as Gorilla Grodd and Green Lantern John Stewart).
Justice (Volumes 1–3) by Jim Krueger, Alex Ross, Doug Braithwaite, The Times, December 21, 2007